The Markt (Dutch for "Market") is the central square of Bruges, West Flanders, Belgium.

Some historical highlights around the Markt include the 12th-century Belfry and the Provincial Court (originally the Waterhall, which in 1787 was demolished and replaced by a classicist building, which from 1850, served as provincial court, and after a fire in 1878, was rebuilt in a neo-Gothic style in 1887). In the centre of the square stands a statue of Jan Breydel and Pieter de Coninck.

The Markt was completely renovated in 1995–96. Parking spaces on the square were removed and the area became mostly traffic-free, thus being more celebration friendly. The renovated square was reopened in 1996 with a concert by Helmut Lotti.

See also
 Cranenburg House

External links

 Live WebCam

Squares in Belgium
Buildings and structures in Bruges
Tourist attractions in Bruges